Massimo Masini (born 9 May 1945) is a former Italian professional basketball player and coach. He was named one of FIBA's 50 Greatest Players in 1991.

Club career
Masini spent the major part of his club career playing with Olimpia Milano. With Olimpia Milano, he won a FIBA European Champions Cup (now called EuroLeague) title, in the 1965–66 season, and two FIBA Saporta Cup titles, in the 1970–71 season, and the 1971–72 season.

National team career
Masini represented the senior men's Italian national basketball team (1963–1972) in international national team competitions. He played at the 1964 Summer Olympic Games, the 1968 Summer Olympic Games, and the 1972 Summer Olympic Games. He won a EuroBasket bronze medal at the 1971 EuroBasket, as he averaged 6 points per game in the tournament.

References

External links

FIBA.com profile

1945 births
Living people
Basketball players at the 1964 Summer Olympics
Basketball players at the 1968 Summer Olympics
Basketball players at the 1972 Summer Olympics
Centers (basketball)
Italian men's basketball players
1963 FIBA World Championship players
1970 FIBA World Championship players
Olympic basketball players of Italy
AMG Sebastiani Basket players
Olimpia Milano players
Montecatiniterme Basketball coaches